The 2015–16 Women's EHF Cup will be 35th edition of EHF's third-tier women's handball competition. It started on 16 October 2015.

Round and draw dates 

All draws held at the European Handball Federation headquarters in Vienna, Austria.

Qualification stage

Round 2
Teams listed first played the first leg at home. Some teams agreed to play both matches in the same venue. Bolded teams qualified into the third round.

|}
Notes

a Both legs were hosted by O.F.N. Ionias.
b Both legs were hosted by Fram.
c Both legs were hosted by A.C. Latsia Nicosia.
d Both legs were hosted by Indeco Conversano.
e Both legs were hosted by Pogon Baltica Szczecin.
f Both legs were hosted by IUVENTA Michalovce.

g Both legs were hosted by ACME-Zalgiris Kaunas.
h Both legs were hosted by Alavarium / Love Tiles.
i Both legs were hosted by HB Dudelange.
j Both legs were hosted by ŽRK Naisa Niš.
k Both legs were hosted by KHF Prishtina.

Round 3
Teams listed first played the first leg at home. Some teams agreed to play both matches in the same venue. Bolded teams qualified into last 16.

|}
Notes

a Both legs were hosted by Siófok KC.
b Both legs were hosted by HC Leipzig.
c Both legs were hosted by Astrakhanochka.
d Both legs were hosted by HC Odense.

e Both legs were hosted by Hubo Initia Hasselt.
f Both legs were hosted by TuS Metzingen.
g Both legs were hosted by Silkeborg-Voel KFUM.
h Both legs were hosted by DHK Banik Most.
h Both legs were hosted by Pogon Baltica Szczecin.

Last 16
Teams listed first played the first leg at home. Bolded teams qualified into quarter-finals.

|}

Quarter-finals
Teams listed first played the first leg at home. Bolded teams qualified into semi-finals.

|}
Notes
a Both legs were hosted by Dunaújváros.

Semi-finals 

|}

Final 

|}

See also
2015–16 Women's EHF Champions League
2015–16 Women's EHF Cup Winners' Cup
2015–16 Women's EHF Challenge Cup

External links
  (official website)

Women's EHF Cup
EHF Cup Women
EHF Cup Women